Narleski is a surname of Polish origin. Notable people with the surname include:

 Bill Narleski (1900–1964), American baseball player
 Ray Narleski (1928–2012), American baseball player, son of Bill

Polish-language surnames